Bulbucata is a commune located in Giurgiu County, Muntenia, Romania. It is composed of four villages: Bulbucata, Coteni, Făcău and Teișori. It is situated in the traditional region of Muntenia.

References

Communes in Giurgiu County
Localities in Muntenia